is a Buddhist temple belonging to the Rinzai school of Japanese Zen, located in the city of Matsudo in Chiba Prefecture, Japan. Its main image is a statue of Amida Nyōrai.

History
The temple was built by Chiba Yoritane in 1256, originally as a Shingon Buddhist temple named Dainichi-ji, with the assistance of the famed prelate Ninshō, and was located in what is now Inage-ku, Chiba.

In he Muromachi period, it was converted to the Rinzai school by Chiba Mitsutane (1360-1426) and was renamed Manman-ji, taking one kanji from the name of the Kamakura kubō, Ashikaga Ujimitsu.

Between 1532 and 1555 Takagi Tanetatsu, a regional leader, invited the priest Kinho from Daitoku-ji in Kyoto to the region. Over the next several years the area gained many adherents to the Rinzai school, and Manman-ji  was related to its present location in 1537. Most of the temple was destroyed by a fire in 1908, and the  Hondō was only reconstructed in 1987.

Manman-ji preserved a pair of Kamakura period statues of the Nio guardians, which are designated an Important Cultural Property (Japan)

Gallery

Sources
Chibaken No Rekishi Sanpo (千葉県の歴史散歩: "Walking Chiba Prefecture's History"), Yamakawa Shuppansha, 1994.

External links 
Manman-ji (in Japanese)

Religious organizations established in the 11th century
Buddhist temples in Chiba Prefecture
Daitoku-ji temples
Matsudo